The women's giant slalom competition of the Sochi 2014 Olympics was held at the Rosa Khutor Alpine Resort near Krasnaya Polyana, Russia, on Tuesday, 18 February.

Summary
The race was won by Tina Maze of Slovenia, who won silver in 2010 at Vancouver. This was her second Olympic gold in Sochi, following the gold in downhill, and fourth career Olympic medal. The silver was won by Anna Fenninger of Austria, and the defending Olympic champion, Viktoria Rebensburg of Germany, was third. Elisabeth Görgl, who won bronze in Vancouver, finished 11th. Among other competitors, some media attention was directed at Vanessa-Mae of Thailand, the last of the finishers. The London-raised pop violinist was over fifty seconds behind Maze.

Both runs were moved up 90 minutes the day prior in anticipation of deteriorating weather. Maze was first out of the gate and posted the best morning time on the clean course. Mid-course fog briefly delayed the start of the afternoon session as the mix changed to snow at the start. Last on the course, Maze posted the 11th best time in the second run to hold on for the gold, just 0.07 seconds ahead of Fenninger.

Results
The first run was started at 09:30 and the second run at 13:00.

References

External links
FIS-Ski.com – 2014 Winter Olympics – Women's giant slalom

Giant slalom